In epidemiology, a non-pharmaceutical intervention (NPI) is any method used to reduce the spread of an epidemic disease without requiring pharmaceutical drug treatments. Examples of non-pharmaceutical interventions that reduce the spread of infectious diseases include wearing a face mask and staying away from sick people.

The US Centers for Disease Control and Prevention (CDC) points to personal, community, and environmental interventions. NPI have been recommended for pandemic influenza at both local and global levels, and studied at large scale during the 2009 swine flu pandemic and the COVID-19 pandemic. NPIs are a set of measures that can be utilized at any time, and are used in the period between the emergence of an epidemic disease and the deployment of an effective vaccine.

Types 
Choosing to stay home to prevent the spread of symptoms of a potential sickness, covering coughs and sneezes, and washing one's hands on a regular basis are all examples of non-pharmaceutical interventions. Another example would include administrators of schools, workplaces, community areas, etc., taking proper preventive action and reminding people to take precaution when need be in order to avoid the spread of disease. Most NPIs are simple, requiring little effort to put into practice and if implemented correctly, could save millions of lives.

Personal protective measures

Hand hygiene 

Hand washing can be done with soap and water, or with alcohol-based hand sanitizers. Hand washing is a practice already in use in many countries in order to prevent the spread of communicable disease. Although alcohol-based rubs may be too expensive in some settings, soap and water hand sanitisation is among the most cost-effective preventative measures.

Respiratory etiquette 

Respiratory etiquette refers to the methods a person uses to prevent transmission of disease when coughing or sneezing. This includes covering the mouth with the hand, elbow, or sleeve while in the process of coughing or sneezing, as well as proper disposal or washing of the contaminated material used to cover the mouth after a cough or sneeze has occurred. Like proper hand hygiene, this is a cost-effective intervention type.

Face masks 

Face masks can be worn to reduce person-to-person transmission of respiratory disease. Medical masks are used in health care settings even during times when there is not a pandemic. During a pandemic, it is recommended that symptomatic individuals wear disposable medical grade masks at all times when exposed to others, and that asymptomatic members of the public wear face masks during severe pandemics to reduce transmission. Although the World Health Organization (WHO) recommended against the use of reusable cloth masks in 2019, it now suggests their use by the general public when physical distancing is not feasible as part of its "Do it all!" approach to the COVID-19 pandemic.

Environmental measures

Surface and object cleaning 
Germs can survive outside the body on hard surfaces for periods ranging from hours to weeks, depending on the virus and environmental conditions. The disinfection of high-touch surfaces with substances such as bleach or alcohol kills germs, preventing indirect contact transmission. Dirty surfaces should be washed before the use of disinfectant.

Ultraviolet lights 
Ultraviolet (UV) light can be used to destroy microorganisms that exist in the environment. The installation of UV light fixtures can be costly and time consuming; it is unlikely that they could be used at the outbreak of an epidemic. There are possible health concerns involving UV light, as it may cause cancer and eye problems. The WHO does not recommend its use.

Increased ventilation 
Increased ventilation of a room through opening a window or through mechanized ventilation systems may reduce transmission within the room. Although opening a window may introduce allergens and air pollution, or in some climates, cold air, it is overall a cheap and effective intervention type, and the advantages likely outweigh the disadvantages.

Modifying humidity 
Viruses such as influenza and coronavirus thrive in cold, dry environments, and increasing the humidity of a room may decrease their transmission. Higher humidity, however, may cause mold and mildew, which may in turn cause respiratory issues. The purchase of humidifiers is also expensive and supplies would likely be short at the outset of an epidemic.

Social distancing measures

Contact tracing 

Contact tracing involves identifying individuals that an infected person may have been in close contact with, and notifying those people that they may have been exposed to the infection. Contact tracing is a measure that brings with it ethical implications, in that it involves invading the privacy of the infected person. It also brings with it a large resource cost, as it requires trained personnel to perform the tracing. Less wealthy countries may not be able to mobilize a contact tracing task force. Contact tracing is likely to lead to an increase to those in quarantine. Overall, it may be justified in that it can reduce the spread of disease at the outset of a pandemic, and allows for early identification of cases in those who were exposed to an infected person.

Isolation of sick individuals 

Infected individuals may be restricted in their movements or isolated away from others, either at home or at a health care facility, or at another designated location. This isolation may either be voluntary (self-isolation), or mandatory. Although voluntary self-isolation is considered to be a low ethical risk, as it is common practice in many areas for someone who is sick to stay at home, mandatory isolation brings with it ethical concerns, such as freedom of movement and social stigma. There is higher risk for infected individuals who share their homes with others to transmit their disease, such as to a family member or roommate. An isolated individual may also be financially impacted by their inability to continue to go to work. Overall, isolation of the sick is widely accepted as an intervention type among health professionals and policy makers, though acceptance among the public varies.

Quarantine of exposed individuals 

Quarantine involves the voluntary or imposed confinement of non-ill persons who have been exposed to an illness, regardless of if they have contracted it. Quarantine will often happen at the home, but may happen elsewhere, such as aboard ships (maritime quarantine) or airlines (onboard quarantine). Like isolation of sick individuals, forced quarantine of exposed individuals brings with it ethical concerns, though in this case the concerns may be greater; quarantine involves restricting the movement of those who may otherwise be fine, and in some cases may even cause them greater risk if they are quarantining with the sick person who they were exposed to, such as a sick family member or roommate who they live with. Like isolation, quarantine brings with it financial risk due to work absenteeism.

School measures and closures 
Measures taken involving schools range from making changes to operations within schools, to complete school closures. Lesser measures may involve reducing the density of students, such as by distancing desks, cancelling activities, reducing class sizes, or staggering class schedules. Sick students may be isolated from the greater student body, such as by having them stay home or otherwise segregated away from other students.

More drastic measures include class dismissal, in which classes are cancelled but the school stays open to provide childcare to some children, and complete school closure. Both measures may either be reactive or proactive: In a reactive case, the measure takes place after an outbreak has occurred within the school; in a proactive case, the measure takes place in order to prevent spread within the community.

Closures of schools may have an impact on the families of affected children, especially low-income families. Parents may be forced to miss work to care for their children, affecting financial stability; children may also miss out on free school meals, causing nutritional concerns. Long absences from schools due to closure can also have negative effects on students' education.

Workplace measures and closures 
Measures taken in the workplace include remote work; paid leave; staggering shifts such that arrival, exit, and break times are different for each employee; reduced contact; and extended weekends.

A more drastic measure is workplace closure. The financial effect of workplace closure on both the individual and the economy could be severe. Where remote work is not possible, such as in the essential services, businesses may not be able to comply with guidelines. One simulation study found that school closure coupled with 50% absenteeism in the workplace would have the highest financial impact of all scenarios it looked at, though some studies found that the combination would be effective at decreasing both the attack rate and height of an epidemic.

One benefit of workplace closures is that when used in conjunction with school closures they would avoid the need for parents to make childcare arrangements for children who are staying home from school.

The WHO recommends workplace closures only in the case of extraordinarily severe epidemics and pandemics.

Avoiding crowding 
Avoiding crowding may involve avoiding crowded areas such as shopping centres and transportation hubs; closing public spaces and banning large gatherings, such as sports events or religious activities; or setting a limit on small gatherings, such as limiting them to no more than five people. There are negative consequences to the banning of gatherings; banning cultural or religious activities, for example, may prevent access to support in a time of crisis. Gatherings also allow for sharing of information, which can provide comfort and reduce fear.

The WHO recommends this intervention only in moderate and severe epidemics and pandemics.

Travel-related measures

Travel advice 
Travel advice involves notifying potential travelers that they may be entering a zone that is affected by a disease outbreak. It allows for informed decisions to be made before travel, and increases awareness when the traveler is within the destination country. Public awareness campaigns have been used in the past for areas impacted by infectious diseases such as dengue, malaria, Middle East respiratory syndrome, and H1N1. Although such awareness campaigns may decrease exposure among those traveling abroad, they may cause economic impact due to reduced travel in countries that the advice has been issued about. Overall this intervention type is considered both feasible and acceptable.

Entry and exit screening 
Entry and exit screening involves the screening of travelers at ports of entry for symptoms of illness. Measures include health declarations, in which travelers make a deceleration that they have not recently had symptoms of illness; visual inspections by the screening agent of the traveler; and the use of non-contact thermography, in which a device such as a thermographic camera is used to measure the traveler's body temperature in order to determine if they have a fever. Such a method may be circumvented by the traveler through the use of antipyretics before travel in order to reduce fever. More intensive measures such as molecular diagnostics and point-of-care rapid antigen detection tests may also be used, but carry with them a high resource cost, and may not be able to be applied to a large number of travelers. A substantial number of resources may be needed in order to train staff and acquire equipment.

Although there is likely no harm to the traveler by the use of this intervention type, a limitation of it is that travelers may be asymptomatic upon arrival, and symptoms may not show until several days after entry, at which point they may have already exposed others to their illness. There are also ethical concerns involving invading the privacy of the traveler. Screening is considered by the WHO to be both acceptable and feasible, though they did not recommend its use in the case of influenza outbreak due to its inefficacy in identifying asymptomatic individuals.

Internal travel restrictions 
Travel within a country may be restricted in order to delay the spread of disease. Restriction of travel within a country is likely to slow the spread of disease, though not prevent it entirely. Its use would be most effective at the outset of a localized and extraordinarily severe pandemic for only a short period of time. It would only be effective if the measures were strict: while a 90% restriction was projected to delay spread by one or two weeks, a 75% restriction saw no effect. An analysis of the spread of influenza in America following complete airline closures due to the September 11 attacks saw a reduction of its spread by thirteen days as compared to previous years.

Restricting travel brings both ethical, and in many countries, legal challenges. Freedom of movement is considered in many places to be a human right, and its restriction may have an adverse impact, particularly among vulnerable populations such as migrant workers and those traveling to seek medical attention. Although 37% of Member States of the WHO included internal travel restrictions as a part of their pandemic preparedness plan as of 2019, some of those countries may face legal challenges in implementing them due to their own laws. Such restrictions may also bring economic impact due to disruption in the supply chain.

Border closure 
Border closure is a measure that involves complete or severe restriction of travel across borders. The measure saw positive effect in the delay of influenza during the 1918 Influenza Pandemic, and was predicted to delay epidemic spread between Hong Kong and mainland China by 3.5 weeks. While border closure is expected to slow the spread of infection, it is not expected to reduce epidemic duration. Strict border closure in island nations could be effective, though supply chain issues may cause adverse disruptions.

Supply chain issues due to border closure are likely to cause disruption of essential goods such as food and medication, as well as serious economic impact. They may have adverse impact on the daily life of individuals. As well, border closure brings with it serious ethical implications, because, like internal travel restrictions, it involves restricting the movements of individuals. It should only be used as a voluntary measure to the maximum extent possible. There may also be stigmatization of individuals from affected areas.

Border closure would be most feasible at the very outset of a pandemic. The WHO recommended it only in extraordinary circumstances, and requested that they be notified by any nation implementing it.

1918 influenza pandemic 

Non-pharmaceutical interventions were widely adopted during the 1918 flu outbreak – most famously, the radical quarantine of Gunnison, Colorado has resulted in sparing the town the worst of the earlier waves of the pandemic. Interventions used included the wearing of face masks, isolation, quarantine, personal hygiene, use of disinfectants, and limits on public gatherings. At the time, the science behind NPIs was new, and was not applied consistently in every area. Retroactive studies on the outbreak have found that the measures were effective in mitigating the spread of the flu.

COVID-19 
COVID-19 is a disease caused by the SARS-CoV-2 virus that spread from China to become a pandemic. Several COVID-19 vaccines are now being used, with 6.54 billion doses administered worldwide as of 12 October 2021.

In the early stages of the COVID-19 pandemic, before vaccines had been developed, NPIs were key to mitigation of infections and reduction of COVID-19-related mortality. Some NPIs have remained in place after extensive vaccination. One report identified over 500 specific NPIs for controlling transmission and spread of the SARS-CoV-2 virus; most of these have been tried in practice. Evidence suggests that highly effective strategies include closing schools and universities, banning large gatherings and wearing face masks.

See also 
 Flatten the curve

References

External links 
 Nonpharmaceutical Interventions on Centers for Disease Control and Prevention

Epidemiology
Centers for Disease Control and Prevention
Public health
Medical hygiene